Głębokie  is a part of the city of Szczecin, Poland situated on the left bank of Oder river, north-west of the Szczecin Old Town and Middle Town.

Before 1945 when Stettin was a part of Germany, the German name of this suburb was Stettin-Glambeck.

Neighbourhoods of Szczecin